"Wherever I Stand" is the first single from Taproot's fourth album Our Long Road Home. This is the band's first single not to be released through Atlantic Records.

Music video
The song's video begins with a man and his girlfriend sitting down on a couch. They start talking, which eventually leads to an argument between the two. The woman changes clothes before leaving her boyfriend's apartment. The man then thinks back to all the good times the two had, such as spending a day at a lake. The man soon heads out after his girlfriend before he finds her standing next to the lake from earlier.

Track listing
 "Wherever I Stand" – 3:26

Charts

References

2008 singles
2008 songs
Taproot (band) songs
Songs written by Stephen Richards (musician)